Western Kenosha County Transit is a regional bus service operating route deviation and door-to-door service throughout Kenosha County, Wisconsin, mainly serving the rural areas west of Interstate-94.  Western Kenosha County Transit runs a weekday route deviation service between Twin Lakes, Wisconsin and the Kenosha, Wisconsin. There is also a weekday rush hour commuter shuttle between Twin Lakes and the Metra Train Station in Antioch, Illinois. Expanded regional routes offer weekly trips to Antioch and Lake Geneva, Wisconsin, with home pick-up service available. The door-to-door service does not require certification and is open to the general public. Riders must call at least one day in advance to schedule a door-to-door trip. Service operates within Kenosha County as well as to Burlington, Lake Geneva, and Antioch.

Western Kenosha County Transit and Kenosha Area Transit honor one another's transfers.

Saturday service was discontinued effective January 1, 2011.

In February 2014, a new schedule was issued which increased the flexibility of the route service by encouraging riders to utilize the route deviation option. Deviations up to a half of a mile off the route are available to all riders for an additional $1.00 charge. Additionally, bus stops at two residential complexes in Twin Lakes and a stop at the Twin Lakes Community Library were added.

Routes

Regular route
 Route 1 - Western County Bus Service (Twin Lakes, Wisconsin-Silver Lake, Wisconsin-Paddock Lake, Wisconsin-Kenosha, Wisconsin)

Commuter shuttles
 Twin Lakes to Antioch

Expanded regional routes
Monday, Wednesday, Friday service from Twin Lakes to Lake Geneva, Wisconsin (home pick-up available)
Thursday mid-day service from Twin Lakes to Antioch (home pick-up available)

References

External links
Official website

Bus transportation in Wisconsin
Kenosha, Wisconsin
Transportation in Kenosha County, Wisconsin